Castelletto is the name of a number of places in Italy:
 Castelletto Cervo, province of Biella
 Castelletto d'Erro, province of Alessandria
 Castelletto di Branduzzo, province of Pavia
 Castelletto d'Orba, province of Alessandria
 Castelletto Merli, province of Alessandria
 Castelletto Molina, province of Asti
 Castelletto Monferrato, province of Alessandria
 Castelletto sopra Ticino, province of Novara
 Castelletto Stura, province of Cuneo
 Castelletto Uzzone, province of Cuneo
 Castelletto (Genoa), a residential quarter in the historic centre of Genoa
 Castelletto, a 700-ft high rock next to the Tofana_di_Rozes mountain in Veneto